Out Louder is an album produced as a collaboration between Medeski Martin & Wood and John Scofield.  It is the first album released under the name "Medeski Scofield Martin & Wood," since 1998's A Go Go was released under Scofield's name alone.  "A Go Go was John's record and we were essentially sidemen, where Out Louder musically comes from all of us" explains Wood.

Track listing
All songs by Medeski Scofield Martin & Wood unless noted.

"Little Walter Rides Again" (Scofield) – 3:55
"Miles Behind" – 2:53
"In Case the World Changes Its Mind" – 3:41
"Tequila and Chocolate" (Wood) – 6:25
"Tootie Ma Is a Big Fine Thing" (Traditional, public domain) – 4:42
"Cachaça" (Wood) – 4:14
"Hanuman" – 6:24
"Telegraph" – 3:55
"What Now" – 4:54
"Julia" (Lennon, McCartney) – 5:18
"Down the Tube" – 11:40
"Legalize It" (Tosh) – 3:55

Performers
John Medeski – keyboards
John Scofield – guitars
Billy Martin – drums, percussion
Chris Wood – basses

References

2006 albums
Medeski Martin & Wood albums
John Scofield albums
Indirecto Records albums